The first season of the drama television series created by José Alberto Castro Por amar sin ley premiered on Las Estrellas on 12 February 2018, at 9.30 pm and ended on 17 June 2018 in Mexico. It revolves around the personal life and work of a group of lawyers belonging to a prestigious law firm.

The season features a large ensemble cast, including Ana Brenda Contreras, David Zepeda, and Julián Gil in the lead roles, along with José María Torre Hütt, Sergio Basañez, Altair Jarabo, Guillermo García Cantú, Pablo Valentín, Ilithya Manzanilla, Geraldine Bazán, Moisés Arizmendi, Manuel Balbi, Víctor García, Eva Cedeño, Azela Robinson, Roberto Ballesteros, Leticia Perdigón, Issabela Camil, Arlette Pacheco, Magda Karina, Lourdes Munguía, Polly, and Daniela Álvarez as part of the main cast.

In the United States the season premiered on Univision on 5 March 2018 at 10pm/9c and ended on 6 July 2018.

On 10 May 2018, Univision revealed through its upfront for the 2018-19 television season that the series renewed for a second season.

Plot 
The season follows the life of a group of lawyers who work for the firm Vega y Asociado founded by Alonso Vega (Guillermo García Cantú). The main characters are Alejandra (Ana Brenda Contreras), Ricardo (David Zepeda) and Carlos (Julián Gil). After the police imprison Carlos for the death of a prostitute, Alejandra begins to work for Vega y Asociado and begins to be attracted to Ricardo, but Carlos, after seeing this, decides to do everything possible to separate them together with the help of Elena (Geraldine Bazán). On the other hand, are Victoria (Altair Jarabo) and Roberto (José María Torre Hütt ), Roberto tries to seduce her, but she refuses to fall into his game, Benjamín (Pablo Valentín) and Leticia (Eva Cedeño), two ambitious lawyers who are lovers, Olivia (Ilithya Manzanilla) who is madly in love with Leonardo (Manuel Balbi), but he only has eyes for his work, Gustavo (Sergio Basañez), who after a bad decision ends his marriage, and Juan López (Víctor García), a lawyer who admires the firm Vega y Asociado and wishes to obtain a position in that law firm.

Cast

Main 
 Ana Brenda Contreras as Alejandra Ponce, she is a lawyer in family cases.
 David Zepeda as Ricardo Bustamante, he is a senior lawyer in family cases, Elena's ex-husband.
 Julián Gil as Carlos Ibarra, he is a prestigious lawyer.
 José María Torre Hütt  as Roberto Morelli, he is an attorney lawyer of Vega y Asociado.
 Sergio Basañez as Gustavo Soto, is a lawyer for Vega and Asociados.
 Altair Jarabo as Victoria Escalante, lawyer of Vega y Asociados, she has an interest in Roberto, but does not show it.
 Guillermo García Cantú as Alonso Vega, he is the owner of the law firm Vega y Asociados.
 Pablo Valentín as Benjamín Acosta, ambitious lawyer of the company Vega Y Asociado.
 Ilithya Manzanilla as Olivia Suárez, she is a dedicated lawyer in cases of family abuse.
 Geraldine Bazán as Elena Fernández, ex-wife of Ricardo.
 Moisés Arizmendi as Alan Páez, Carlos cousin.
 Manuel Balbi as Leonardo Morán, lawyer of Vega y Asociado.
 Víctor García as Juan López, independent lawyer who then starts working for Vega y Asociados.
 Eva Cedeño as Leticia Jara, junior lawyer of Vega y Asociado, Benjamin's lover.
 Azela Robinson as Paula Ortega, Alejandra's mother.
 Roberto Ballesteros as Jaime Ponce,  Alejandra's father.
 Leticia Perdigón as Susana López, Juan's mother.
 Issabela Camil as Isabel, Gustavo's wife.
 Arlette Pacheco as Carmen, secretary of Vega y Asociados.
 Magda Karina as Sonia, prosecutor of the public ministry.
 Nataly Umaña as Tatiana, she is Patricia Linares friend.
 Lourdes Munguía as Lourdes, she is the best friend of Paula.
 Polly as Alicia, she is the best friend of Paula.
 Daniela Álvarez as Fer, neighbor of Juan and Susana, help Juan to do research.

Recurring 
 Yamil Yaber as Federico Bustamante, Elena's son.
 Karime Yaber as Natalia Bustamante, Elena's daughter.

Special guest stars 

 María José as Patricia Linares, she is a prostitute who attends Carlos' bachelor party.
 David Ostrosky as Saúl Morales, he is a prestigious businessman who comes to Carlos to help him with defamation.
 Ricardo Fastlicht as Méndez, he is a businessman who goes crazy because of Benjamin.
 María José Magán as Ana María, she was Leonardo's girlfriend, until she decides to be unfaithful to her best friend.
 Gilberto Romo as Daniela Segura, is a transgender who struggles to have the paternity of his son.
 Jade Fraser as Rocío, she is Victoria's friend, she suffers abuse from her husband.
 Alejandro Ibarra as Darío, he is the husband of Rocío, he ends up imprisoned for murdering his wife.
 Ana Patricia Rojo as Lina, she is the daughter of Virginia.
 Jacqueline Andere as Virginia, she is an elderly lady, who is accused by her son of suffering from a disease that prevents her from deciding what to do with all her fortune.
 Lisette Morelos as Mariana, she is an old ex-girlfriend of Ricardo.
 Joshua Gutiérrez as Fermín, he is the employee of Virginia.
 Fabián Robles as Pérez, is a man who seeks help in Alejandra to be able to have custody of his children.
 Zaide Silvia Gutiérrez as Silvia, she is the employee of Jimena.
 Dobrina Cristeva as Jimena, she owns a mansion that accuses Silvia of having stolen an expensive jewel.
 Natalia Juárez as Anita, she is Jimena's daughter.
 Aleida Núñez as Milena, she is Gustavo's lover.
 Raúl Magaña as Raúl, Mariana husband's.
 Andrea Ortega-Lee as Rosita, cleaning employee of Vega y Asociados.
 Sofía Castro as Nora, a young woman who is accused of culpable murder.
 Nuria Bages as Cinthya, Nora's mother.
 Jesús Ochoa as Taxista, a taxi driver who tries to abuse Nora and dies after a strong confrontation with Nora.
 Marco Muñoz as Ojeda, a client who goes with Ricardo to divorce his wife.
 Pilar Ixquic Mata as Laura, Ojeda's wife.
 Alex Sirvent as Arturo, boy who knows Olivia through a dating app.
 José Elías Moreno as Joel, friend of Ricardo who loses his house because of his children.
 Ernesto D'Alessio as Agustín, is the ex-husband of Lorenza, who demands a pension for his son who suffers from certain problems.
 Margarita Magaña as Lorenza, Agustín's ex-wife.
 Gabriela Zamora as Lupita
 Gloria Aura as Inés
 Daniela Noguez as Claudia
 José Carlos Ruiz as Armando
 Aitor Iturrioz as Óscar
 Rodrigo Cuevas as Patricio
 Pepe Olivares as Lara
 Carlos Gatica as Rodrigo
 Andrea Torre as Nuria
 Toño Mauri as Dr. Ávalos
 Luis Xavier as Papá Gutiérrez
 Claudia Acosta as Florentina
 Juan Carlos Nava as Tomás
 Renata Notni as Sol
 Adal Ramones as Alberto
 Laura Carmine as Berenice
 Danna García as Fanny
 José Ron as Ramón
 Pedro Prieto as Alfonso
 Macaria as Marcia
 Silvia Manríquez as Melisa
 Carmen Becerra as Ligia
 Luis Romano as Fabián
 Daniela Luján as Valeria
 Alejandra Zaid as Alexa
 Ernesto Gómez Cruz as Plutarco
 Kimberly Dos Ramos as Sofía

Production 
The start of production began on 6 November 2017, and concluded in May 2018.

Reception 
The series premiered on 12 February 2018 with a total of 3.1 million viewers, surpassing its closest competition, El César. Despite this excellent start, the most watched television show that day in Mexico was La rosa de Guadalupe, which was watched by a total of 3.4 million viewers.

In the United States it premiered on Univision on 5 March 2018 with a total of 1.58 million viewers, surpassing to Enemigo íntimo its closest competition, which was only seen by 1.54 million viewers. During its first month of broadcasting, the telenovela was positioned as the most watched Spanish-language television program at 10pm/9c, surpassing Telemundo. After being more than a month being Univision's most watched show at 10pm, and surpassing Telemundo's telenovela, on  8 May 2018 during the premiere of the sixth season of El Señor de los Cielos, the telenoela only recorded one a total of 1.44 million viewers, while the premiere of El Señor de los Cielos reached a total of 2.14 million viewers, leaving Univision production as the least watched program at 10pm.

Episodes

References 

2018 Mexican television seasons